Harcos LLC (Harcos Laboratories) are the makers of caffeinated novelty energy supplements and consumables. Harcos Laboratories operates out of Santa Monica, California.

Company history 
Harcos Laboratories was formed in 2007 by Aaron Rasmussen and Elijah Szasz, both co-workers in the industrial robotics industry.

In January 2008, Mana Energy Potions was released. The product itself is packaged in a bottle similar to those seen in video games. After gaining attention on national television, internet geek blogs, and news sites, Mana Energy Potion started being sold in retailers around the United States.

In January 2009, Health Energy Potion was released. Much like Mana, Health retains its virtual-counterpart look with the color and bottle shape found in video games.

In October 2009, Harcos began distributing Blood Energy Potion.  The energy supplement in an IV bag pouch contains a caffeinated liquid with a similar color (deep red), consistency and nutritional profile of blood by packing iron, protein, enzymes and electrolytes into a fruit punch supplement. This product is targeted toward horror and vampire culture fans.

Additional products include Nuclear Energy Powder, Zombie Blood, Love Energy Potion, Luck Energy Potion, and Zombie Jerky.

Culture 
Harcos Labs targets consumers around the United States as well as gamers and fans of popular culture. Harcos Labs has appeared at Comic-Con, PAX, Anime Expo, and many other conventions nationwide since 2008.

Mana Energy Potions have been featured in the video games ARCA Sim Racing, BlazBlue: Calamity Trigger, and Mystic Emporium.

See also 
List of energy drinks

References

External links 
 Company website

Food and drink companies established in 2008
Energy drinks
Companies based in Santa Monica, California
2008 establishments in California